Eisner or Eissner is a surname. Notable people with the name include:

 Alexey Eisner (1905–1984), Russian poet, translator and writer
 Ali Eisner (born 1973), Canadian composer, director and photographer for children's television
 Bertold Eisner (1875–1956), Croatian law professor, pioneer of Croatian jurisprudence and writer
 Betty Grover Eisner (1915–2004), American psychologist, pioneering researcher on LSD and psychedelic drugs
 Brian Eisner (born c. 1942), American tennis player and coach
 Breck Eisner, son of Michael Eisner and film director
 Bruce Eisner (1948–2013), pen name of Bruce Jay Ehrlich, American psychologist and author of the book Ecstasy: The MDMA Story
 Clara Eissner, see Clara Zetkin
 Curt Eisner (1890-1981), German entomologist, specialised in snow butterflies 
 David A. Eisner, British physiologist
 David Eisner (born 1958), Canadian actor
 Edward Eisner (1929-1987), Hungarian-born physicist 
 Elliot W. Eisner, Professor of Art and Education at Stanford University
 Eric Eisner, son of Michael and film producer
 Eric Eisner (lawyer), former head of The Geffen Film Company
 Gilbert Eisner, American fencer
 Herbert Sigmund Eisner (1921 – 2011), British-German physicist and playwright
 Hubert Eisner (1897-date of death unknown), Austrian Nazi and became Kreisleiter of Voitsberg
 Ib Eisner (1925–2003), Danish artist
 Jacob Eisner (born 1947), Israeli basketball player
 Eisner Von Eisenhof brothers Julius and Jacob, Bohemian aristocrats and traders
 Kurt Eisner (1867–1919), German-Jewish journalist, leader of the 1918 revolution in Bavaria
 Lotte H. Eisner (1896?–1983), German writer
 Manuel Eisner, British academic and researcher on the history of interpersonal violence
 Mark Eisner, American prominent lawyer, tax expert, and politician
 Maria Eisner (1909–1991), Italian photographer
 Michael Eisner, former head of The Walt Disney Company
 Pavel Eisner (or Paul Eisner; 1889–1958), Czech-German linguist and translator 
 Philip Eisner, American screenwriter, author of the screenplay for the 1997 film Event Horizon
 Shiri Eisner, Israeli writer and activist
 Sigmund Eisner, Austrian entrepreneur
 Sigmund Eisner (academic) (1920–2012), American scholar of medieval literature
 Simon Eisner, Swedish philanthropist
 Sol Eisner, American soccer player
 Tanja Eisner (born 1980), Ukrainian and German mathematician
 Thomas Eisner, chemical ecologist and author of several books, including For the Love of Insects
 Will Eisner (1917–2005), comics artist and writer, best known as the creator of The Spirit

German-language surnames